Søstrene Grene (translating to "The Grene Sisters") is a Danish retail chain founded in Aarhus, Denmark in 1973 by husband-and-wife team Inger Grene and Knud Cresten Vaupell Olsen.

The founders' sons run the company today, with Mikkel Grene as the CEO and Cresten Grene as the creative director.

Store concept

Søstrene Grene's stores are shaped like labyrinths, and they play classical music in all of their stores. The stores sell Scandinavian design, home accessories, kitchenware, gifts, stationery and interior furnishings and much more.

The two "sisters" referred to in the company's name are the fictional "Anna" and "Clara". They are shown as silhouettes in the company logo, and are shown on signs throughout stores; the company refers to them as the stores' "hosts". Their fictional personalities are based on those of Inger Grene's two paternal aunts.

Stores

The first Søstrene Grene store opened in 1973 on the first floor of Søndergade 11 in Aarhus. The chain expanded with stores in Aalborg and Herning in 1989, and the expansion continued throughout the 90s and 00s. In 2005, the chain opened in Reykjavik in Iceland, while the stores in Stavanger, Norway, and Malmö, Sweden, opened in 2006. The biggest store outside of Denmark is found in Dublin, Ireland.

During 2015, the company opened 20 new stores in Denmark. Today, Søstrene Grene is located on 15 different markets: Denmark, Finland, Norway, Sweden, Iceland, the United Kingdom, Ireland, the Netherlands, France, the Faroe Islands, Germany, Switzerland, Austria and Belgium.

The company moved its headquarters to Pakhusene at Aarhus Ø in April 2017.

Notes

References 

Danish companies established in 1973
Danish brands
Retail companies of Denmark
Retail companies established in 1973